Yahya Sulaiman Ali al-Shehri (born 26 June 1990) is a Saudi Arabian professional footballer who plays as a left winger for Al-Raed and the Saudi Arabia national team.

He was promoted from the youth team of Ettifaq and appeared in the first team in the 2009–10 Saudi Professional League. In 2013, he transferred to Al-Nassr. In 2018, he was loaned to CD Leganés and became one of the nine Saudi players to go play abroad since Osama Hawsawi.

Club career
On 1 June 2013, in the biggest deal in the history of Saudi football, Yahya Al-Shehri officially signed a contract to join Al-Nassr in return for 48 million Saudi Riyals.

On 19 August 2021, Al-Shehri joined Al-Raed.

International career
Al-Shehri has been capped for the Saudi national team U-17s, U-18s, U-19s, U-20s and Under-21 side, and eventually for the first team. Yahya made his first appearance with the first Saudi team in a friendly match against Tunisia on 14 October 2009.

In May 2018, he was named in the Saudi Arabia senior national team's preliminary squad for the 2018 FIFA World Cup in Russia.

Career statistics

Club

International

Scores and results list Saudi Arabia's goal tally first, score column indicates score after each Al-Shehri goal.

Honours
Al Nassr
Saudi Professional League 2013–14, 2014–15, 2018–19
Saudi Crown Prince Cup: 2013–14
Saudi Super Cup: 2019, 2020

References

External links

1990 births
Living people
People from Dammam
Association football wingers
Saudi Arabian footballers
Saudi Professional League players
Ettifaq FC players
Al Nassr FC players
CD Leganés players
Al-Raed FC players
2015 AFC Asian Cup players
2019 AFC Asian Cup players
Saudi Arabia international footballers
Saudi Arabian expatriate footballers
Saudi Arabian expatriate sportspeople in Spain
Expatriate footballers in Spain
2018 FIFA World Cup players
Saudi Arabia youth international footballers